Aprobarbital (or aprobarbitone), sold as Oramon, Somnifaine, and Allonal, is a barbiturate derivative invented in the 1920s by Ernst Preiswerk. It has sedative, hypnotic and anticonvulsant properties, and was used primarily for the treatment of insomnia.  Aprobarbital was never as widely used as more common barbiturate derivatives such as phenobarbital and is now rarely prescribed as it has been replaced by newer drugs with a better safety margin.

See also 
 Alphenal

References 

Barbiturates
Allyl compounds
GABAA receptor positive allosteric modulators
Isopropyl compounds